Following is a list of senators of Eure, people who have represented the department of Eure in the Senate of France.

Third Republic

Senators for Eure under the French Third Republic were:

 Camille Clément de La Roncière-Le Noury (1876–1881)
 Albert, 4th duc de Broglie (1876–1885)
 Jean-Louis Lepouzé (1882)
 Alphonse Lecointe (1882–1890)
 Charles d'Osmoy (1885–1894)
 Victor Milliard (1890–1921)
 Anatole Guindey (1891–1898)
 Albert Parissot (1895–1911)
 Jules Thorel (1898–1906)
 Léon Monnier (1907–1923)
 Maurice Hervey (1912–1936)
 Abel Lefèvre (1921–1939)
 Ernest Neuville (1930–1939)
 Prosper Josse (1924–1930) then (1939–1945)
 André Join-Lambert (1937–1945)
 Léon Lauvray (1939–1945)

Fourth Republic

Senators for Eure under the French Fourth Republic were:

 René Cardin (1946–1948)
 Georges Chauvin (1946–1948)
 Georges Bernard (1948–1957)
 Raymond Laillet (Montullé) (1948–1959)
 Jean Brajeux (1957–1959)

Fifth Republic 
Senators for Eure under the French Fifth Republic:

References

Sources

 
Lists of members of the Senate (France) by department